Maria Elena Camerin and Emmanuelle Gagliardi were the defending champions, but chose to compete in Luxembourg at the same week.

Li Ting and Sun Tiantian won the title by defeating Vania King and Jelena Kostanić 6–4, 2–6, 7–5 in the final.

Seeds

Draw

Draw

References

 Official results archive (ITF)
 Official results archive (WTA)

Guangzhou International Women's Open
2006 WTA Tour